The men's +109 kg competition at the 2019 World Weightlifting Championships was held on 27 September 2019.

Schedule

Medalists

Records

Results

New records

References

Results 

Men's 109+ kg